Leuthard II (c.806 – 858 or 869) was the seventh Count of Paris.
He was the son of Beggo and Alpais, who may have been a granddaughter of Charlemagne.

References

Medieval French nobility
800s births
Date of death unknown
House of Girard
9th-century people from West Francia